This Little Bird is the fourth studio album by Allison Crowe to be released on her independent label, Rubenesque Records Ltd. Overall, it's the fifth album release from the Canadian singer-songwriter — following Crowe's double-CD Live at Wood Hall album of 2005 (see 2005 in music). The album's 12 songs were recorded, essentially, live-off-the-floor at locations spanning the breadth of Canada — from Corner Brook, Newfoundland in the east, to Salt Spring Island and Nanaimo, British Columbia in the west. The album was released on October 9, 2006.

This collection consists of nine original songs along with cover versions of: Joni Mitchell's "A Case of You"; John Sebastian of The Lovin' Spoonful's "Darling Be Home Soon"; and Ronnie Shannon's "I Never Loved a Man (The Way I Love You)" (Aretha Franklin's break-out song in 1967).

On This Little Bird, Allison Crowe, always in creative control of her recordings, for the first time took on the role of primary engineer and producer.

Track listing
Effortless (Allison Crowe) – 4:42
Skeletons and Spirits (A. Crowe) – 3:19
"A Case of You" (Joni Mitchell) – 4:57
Alive and Breathing (A. Crowe) – 4:33
There Is (A. Crowe) – 3:27
Now (A. Crowe) – 4:55
Silence (A. Crowe) – 5:57
Circular Reasoning (A. Crowe) – 3:26
"Darling Be Home Soon" (John Sebastian) – 5:20
Phoenix (A. Crowe) – 4:32
I Never Loved a Man (The Way I Love You) (Ronnie Shannon) – 3:52
This Little Bird (A. Crowe) – 3:39

Personnel
Allison Crowe –vocals, piano, guitar
Dave Baird –acoustic bass, electric bass
Laurent Boucher –percussion
Del Crowe –guitar

Production
Producer: Allison Crowe
Engineer: Allison Crowe
Assistant Production and Engineering: Ryan Adams, Louis McDonald, Mike McDonald
Cover photos: Billie Woods
Art Direction: Alix Whitmire

External links
Allison Crowe official site
This Little Bird reviews
"I Never Loved a Man (The Way I Love You)" 
“Skeletons and Spirits” 

Allison Crowe albums
2006 albums